The Modern Lovers were an American rock band.

Modern Lovers may also refer to:

Music
 The Modern Lovers (album), a 1976 album by the band
 Modern Lovers 88, a 1987 album by Jonathan Richman and the Modern Lovers
 "Modern Lovers", a 1982 song by Fay Ray
 "Modern Lovers", a 1986 song by Sandy Marton

Other uses
 Modern Lovers (novel), a 2016 novel by Emma Straub
 Modern Lovers, a 1989–1990 photographic exhibition and 1990 book by Bettina Rheims